Kayode Oyebode Adebowale FRSC (born 11 January 1962) is a Nigerian professor and scientist and the 13th Vice-chancellor of the University of Ibadan. In October 2021 he became the Vice-Chancellor of the University of Ibadan, having formerly served as the deputy vice-chancellor (administration) of the University of Ibadan, and as the dean of the faculty of science in same institution.

Early Childhood and Education 
Prof Kayode Adebowale was born on the 11th of January, 1962 and he is a native of the Gateway state, Ogun in Western Nigeria. He had his primary education at St. Marks Primary School, Oke-Ijaga, Ijebu Igbo between 1967 and 1972 while his secondary was at Ayedaade Grammar School, Ikire between 1973 and 1978. He earned his B.Sc in Chemistry in 1984 from the University of Ibadan at the age of 22. He received his Masters Degree and Ph.D from the same university in 1986 and 1991 respectively. He began his academic career as a Graduate Assistant from the University of Ibadan and became a professor of industrial chemistry in 2006.

Academic Life 
He was once a lecturer at Federal University of Technology. He has a record number of 137 published and peer-reviewed scientific papers, 14 conference papers and 3 technical reports. He was formerly the Deputy Vice-Chancellor (Administration), University of Ibadan. Prof Adebowale, MNI, FRSC, FAS, FAvH, FCSN, FSAN, FPIN is the 13th Vice Chancellor of the University of Ibadan.

On Thursday, 14 October 2021, the Council Chairman and Pro-Chancellor of the University, Chief Dr. John Odigie-Oyegun, announced the appointment of Professor Kayode Adebowale as the 13th Vice-Chancellor of the University.

References

1962 births
Living people
University of Ibadan alumni
Academic staff of the University of Ibadan
Fellows of the Royal Society of Chemistry
Vice-Chancellors of the University of Ibadan
Nigerian chemists